Năpradea is a commune located in Sălaj County, Crișana, Romania. It is composed of five villages: Cheud (Köd), Năpradea, Someș-Guruslău (Nagygoroszló), Traniș (Kisgoroszló) and Vădurele (Szamosdebrecen).

Sights 
 Wooden Church in Vădurele, built in the 17th century, historic monument
 Orthodox Church in Cheud, built in the 19th century (1894)
 Village Museum in Năpradea
 Aranyos Citadel in Cheud, medieval fortress built in the 12th century, historic monument
 Moșul and Baba stones, Natural reserve in Someș Guruslău

References

Communes in Sălaj County
Localities in Crișana